Charles McGonigal (born 1968/1969) is a former head of counterintelligence in the New York City field office of the Federal Bureau of Investigation.  he is under federal indictment on multiple charges.

Education
In 1990, McGonigal was awarded a Bachelor of Business Administration, later earning a master’s degree from Johns Hopkins University.

Career

Federal Bureau of Investigation
McGonigal joined the Federal Bureau of Investigation in 1996. During his tenure at the New York Field Office, he was detailed to the TWA Flight 800 investigation, and later became one of the original case agents assigned to the Russian Illegals Program. In 2002, he was appointed as a supervisory special agent in the Counter-Espionage Section at FBI Headquarters. In 2006, he became the field supervisor of a counter-espionage squad at the Washington Field Office. McGonigal led the 2010 investigation into the release by WikiLeaks of over 200,000 State Department documents. He also led the investigation into Chelsea Manning's collaboration with WikiLeaks.

In 2016, McGonigal was named Section Chief of the Cyber-Counterintelligence Coordination Section of the Counterintelligence Division. On October 4, 2016, it was announced that McGonigal was named "Special Agent in Charge of the Counterintelligence Division for the New York Field Office", appointed by James B. Comey.

In March 2017, McGonigal expressed concern in a text message to then-FBI Deputy Assistant Director of the Counterintelligence Division Jennifer Boone that the surveillance warrant application on Carter Page could leak to the public after being presented to the United States House Permanent Select Committee on Intelligence.

McGonigal retired from the FBI in 2018.

Private sector
In September 2018, McGonigal was hired as a vice-president at Brookfield Properties.

In the spring of 2022, McGonigal was hired as the global head of security for Aman Resorts. McGonigal’s hiring was done through a very obscure process and raised many eyebrows there, according to Aman staffers, as the previous director of corporate security had been reassigned for no apparent reason, and McGonigal continued to be retained by the company even after news first surfaced that he was under investigation.

Federal charges
In January 2023, McGonigal was arrested and federally indicted on charges of money laundering, making false statements in mandatory disclosures to the FBI, violating U.S. sanctions on Russia, and other counts for allegedly working with Russian oligarch Oleg Deripaska, who had allegedly tasked McGonigal with investigating a Deripaska rival. He was separately indicted for allegedly accepting payments amounting to more than US$225,000 from a former Albanian intelligence employee and acting to advance that person's interests. Days after his arrest, McGonigal was released on $500,000 bond after pleading not guilty.

The FBI's investigation into McGonigal reportedly began sometime in 2018, after McGonigal was seen by British authorities meeting with a Russian contact they had under surveillance.

Personal life
McGonigal and his wife Pamela have two children. They have a home in Chevy Chase, Maryland. From around spring 2017 to late 2018, McGonigal was reportedly having an affair with Allison Guerriero.

McGonigal kept framed portraits of himself shaking hands with Albanian Prime Minister Edi Rama as well as former Kosovo Prime Minister Ramush Haradinaj in his home office.

References

Living people
Federal Bureau of Investigation agents
Prisoners and detainees of the United States federal government
21st-century United States government officials
Place of birth missing (living people)
Date of birth missing (living people)
Year of birth missing (living people)
Johns Hopkins University alumni
Johns Hopkins Carey Business School alumni